Edward Tracey (born 5 June 1943) is an Irish boxer. He competed in the men's featherweight event at the 1968 Summer Olympics. At the 1968 Summer Olympics, he defeated Errol West of Jamaica, before losing to Antonio Roldán of Mexico.

References

1943 births
Living people
Irish male boxers
Olympic boxers of Ireland
Boxers at the 1968 Summer Olympics
Sportspeople from Dublin (city)
Featherweight boxers